Shun Tin Estate is a public housing estate in Shun Lee, Kowloon, Hong Kong. It comprises 11 residential blocks completed in 1981, 1983 and 1989 respectively.

History
The estate, reportedly the 105th built by the Housing Authority, began admitting tenants in late 1981. Some came from the old Lei Cheng Uk and Kun Tong estates, making way for redevelopments and improvements there.

On 21 July 1986, a HK$24.8 contract was awarded to construct a secondary school at Shun Tin Estate.

On 10 October 2015, a 58-year-old man was attacked after disputing with a 46-year-old man at Man Shun Restaurant in Tin Kuen House of Shun Tin Estate. He was rushed by an ambulance to United Christian Hospital in unconscious state and was later transferred to Queen Elizabeth Hospital for treatment. He was pronounced dead at 12.54pm on 16 January 2016. The police has classified the wounding case as manslaughter.

Houses

Demographics
According to the 2016 by-census, Shun Tin Estate had a population of 18,118. The median age was 47.2 and the majority of residents (96.2 per cent) were of Chinese ethnicity. The average household size was 2.7 people. The median monthly household income of all households (i.e. including both economically active and inactive households) was HK$19,400.

Politics
Shun Tin Estate is located in Shun Tin constituency of the Kwun Tong District Council. It is currently represented by Mok Kin-shing, who was elected in the 2019 elections.

Education
Shun Tin Estate is in Primary One Admission (POA) School Net 46. Within the school net are multiple aided schools (operated independently but funded with government money); no government primary schools are in this net.

See also

Shun Lee

References

Residential buildings completed in 1981
Residential buildings completed in 1983
Residential buildings completed in 1989
Shun Lee
Public housing estates in Hong Kong